Chickasaw State Park is a locally managed public recreation area located on U.S. Route 43 approximately  north of Linden in Marengo County, Alabama. The  state park was developed in the 1930s by members of the Civilian Conservation Corps on property that the state had owned since 1819. It was one of several Alabama state parks that either closed or saw curtailment of services in 2015 following state budget cuts.

Activities and amenities
The park offers picnicking, playground, and camping facilities and is a stop on the Alabama Black Belt Birding Trail.

References

External links
Chickasaw State Park Alabama Department of Conservation and Natural Resources

State parks of Alabama
Protected areas of Marengo County, Alabama
Civilian Conservation Corps in Alabama
Alabama placenames of Native American origin